Henrik Göran Casimir Ehrnrooth (born 7 July 1954 in Helsinki) is a Finnish economist, manager and investor. He has been CEO and President at KONE since April 2014. Previously he served as KONE's CFO between 2009–2014. Prior to his career at KONE, he worked at Goldman Sachs from 1998–2009, most recently as a Managing Director in the Investment Banking Division and at UBS in various positions from 1994–1998. He studied at the University of Helsinki and the Hanken School of Economics and graduated from the latter in 1981.

Pöyry
Henrik Ehrnrooth owns with his brothers Georg Ehrnrooth and Carl-Gustaf Ehrnrooth Corbis S.A., that is the biggest owner of Pöyry (2012).
Henrik Ehrnrooth started as economist at Pöyry in 1979. He was managing director at Pöyry from 1986 and the concern manager from 1995. Henrik Ehrnrooth is member of the company Board of Directors since 1997 and chairman since 2003.

YIT 
Ehrnrooth family investment fund Structor is the biggest owner of the construction company YIT with share of  12.1% in the end of January 2012. Henrik Ehrnrooth is the chairman of the construction company YIT Board of Directors since 2009. YIT Board of Directors (2012): Henrik Ehrnrooth, Reino Hanhinen, Kim Gran, Eino Halonen, Antti Herlin Kone and Satu Huber (Tapiola Group Pension Fund).

Otava 
Henrik Ehrnrooth is a member of the family media company Otava Board of Directors since 1988. Otava Board of Directors (2012) Olli Reenpää chairman, Henrik Ehrnrooth, Heikki Lehtonen, Jorma Ollila and Eero Broman.

Family 

Father Casimir Ehrnrooth (1931) has worked as CEO in Kaukas paper factory (today UPM-Kymmene), and Board of Directors of Union Bank (today Nordea), and as chairman of Nokia (1992–1999). 

Henrik’s siblings are Johanna Ehrnrooth (1958–2020), Georg Ehrnrooth (1966) and Carl-Gustaf Ehrnrooth (1969).

Henrik Ehrnrooth owns with his brothers Georg Ehrnrooth and Carl-Gustaf Ehrnrooth Corbis S.A. Sister Johanna Ehrnrooth was a painter. Brother Georg Ehrnrooth is also member of the Pöyry Board of Directors.

References

1954 births
Living people
Finnish businesspeople